This is a list of Archaeological Protected Monuments in Mullaitivu District, Sri Lanka.

Notes

References

External links
 
 

 
Archaeological